The flag of the Governor-General of Australia is an official flag of Australia and is flown continuously on buildings and other locations when the Governor-General of Australia is present.

History

The flag has existed as three versions, the original flag used between 1902 and 1909 being a Union Flag defaced with a six pointed star, crowned, surrounded by ears of corn and a gold circlet. In 1909, following the addition of a seventh point to the Commonwealth Star on the Australian Blue and Red Ensigns, the star was changed to a seven-pointed star.

On 16 July 1936 the Governor-General adopted a new flag for official use in Australia. The flag has a 1:2 ratio, it has a royal blue background and in the centre of the flag there is a Royal Crest (a crowned lion standing on a Tudor Crown) and the words "COMMONWEALTH OF AUSTRALIA" in dark blue letters on a gold scroll below the Crest. A similar design is used in most other Commonwealth realms.

In 1953 the flag was modified again, replacing the Tudor Crown with St Edward's Crown. The flag is otherwise identical to that introduced in 1936.

Usage
The flag is flown continuously wherever the Governor-General is in residence and is also used as a car flag.

Historical versions

See also

List of Australian flags
Flags of the governors of the Australian states
Queen's Personal Australian Flag

References

Bibliography

External links

Governor-General
Governors-General of Australia
1902 establishments in Australia
Flags displaying animals